HRPC can refer to:
 Hudson River Psychiatric Center
 Hormone-refractory prostate cancer